The XVII Racquetball European Championships were held in Brembate, (Italy) from July 15 -20 2013, with men's national and women's national teams in competition. In addition to the European Championships, the European Racquetball Masters and Junior Racquetball Championships were held at the same time. The venue was the Centro Communale Spotivo di Brembate, with 2 regulation racquetball court. The opening ceremony was held on July 19th .

Men's Singles Competition

Women's Single competition

Men's Doubles Competition

Women's Doubles competition

See also
European Racquetball Championships

External links
Standings ERF website
Men's singles results
Ladies singles results
Mens doubles results
Ladies doubles results

European Racquetball Championships 
Racquetball
2013 in Italian sport
International sports competitions hosted by Italy
Racquetball in Italy